Kiyoko Fukuda may refer to:
 Kiyoko Fukuda (First Lady) (born 1944), First Lady of Japan, wife of Yasuo Fukuda
 Kiyoko Fukuda (volleyball) (born 1970), Japanese former volleyball player